The Arkansas State League was an American minor league baseball league that played in various seasons between 1894 and 1935, forming three different times. The first version was in operation in 1894, followed by an 1897 league. The Class D level league operated from 1908 to 1909 in Arkansas and Louisiana and also in 1934 to 1935 in Arkansas and Missouri. In 1936, the league evolved to become the Arkansas-Missouri League. Little Rock and Rogers each won two league championships.

Cities represented
Alexandria, Louisiana: Alexandria Hoo Hoos 1909 
Argenta, Arkansas: Argenta 1908; Argenta Shamrocks 1909 
Bentonville, Arkansas: Bentonville Officeholders 1934–1935
Brinkley, Arkansas: Brinkley Infants 1908
Camden, Arkansas: Camden Rainmakers 1894 
Cassville, Missouri: Cassville Tigers 1935
Fayetteville, Arkansas: Fayetteville Educators 1934; Fayetteville Bears 1935
Fort Smith, Arkansas: Fort Smith Indians 1894, 1897; Ft. Smith Soldiers 1909 
Helena, Arkansas: Helena Ponies 1908; Helena Hellions 1909
Hot Springs, Arkansas: Hot Springs Bathers 1894, 1897;  Hot Springs Giants 1908; Hot Springs Vaporites 1909
Huntsville, Arkansas: Huntsville Red Birds 1935
Jonesboro, Arkansas: Jonesboro Zebras 1909
Little Rock, Arkansas: Little Rock Rose Buds 1894; Little Rock Senators 1897
Monroe, Louisiana: Monroe Municipals 1909 
Morrilton, Arkansas: Morrilton Cotton Pickers 1894
Newport, Arkansas & Batesville, Arkansas: Newport Pearl Diggers 1908; Newport-Batesville Pearl Diggers 1909
Pine Bluff, Arkansas: Pine Bluff Pine Knotts 1908 
Poplar Bluff, Missouri: Poplar Bluff Tigers 1908 
Rogers, Arkansas: Rogers Rustlers 1934; Rogers Cardinals 1935
Siloam Springs, Arkansas: Siloam Springs Buffaloes 1934; Siloam Springs Travelers 1935
Texarkana, Arkansas: Texarkana 1894 ;Texarkana Nobles 1897
Texarkana, Texas: Texarkana 1909

Standings & statistics

1894, 1897
1894 Arkansas State League
 
Season ended June 23
1897 Arkansas State League
 After the league disbanded August 18, Little Rock and Hot Springs played a 21-game series for the championship of Arkansas.

1908 & 1909
1908 Arkansas State League
Poplar Bluff was replaced by Brinkley June 8. No Playoffs were scheduled.

1909 Arkansas State League

Argenta & Alexandria disbanded June 7; Monroe moved to Newport-Batesville July 1. League disbanded July 7.

1934 to 1935
1934 Arkansas State League
The Arkansas State League reformed with four teams. Franchises based in Bentonville, Arkansas, Fayetteville, Arkansas, Rogers, Arkansas, and Siloam Springs, Arkansas joined. The winners of the first and second halves of the season played for the league championship at the end of the year.

Playoff: Rogers defeated Siloam Springs 5-2 in a one game playoff for the first half title. Bentonville was declared second half winner when Fayetteville and Siloam Springs folded August 19. Finals: Rogers defeated Bentonville 4 games to 3 for the championship.

1935 Arkansas State League
The league expanded, adding the franchises in Cassville, Missouri and Huntsville, Arkansas to expand from four teams to six teams.

Playoff: Rogers (1st half winner) defeated Siloam Springs (2nd half winner) 4 games to 3 for the championship.
All teams continued play in the renamed 1936 Arkansas–Missouri League. The Arkansas State League folded.

References
Sumner, Benjamin Barrett.  Minor League Baseball Standings:All North American Leagues, Through 1999.  Jefferson, N.C.:McFarland. 

Hall, John G. "Majoring in The Minors."  Oklahoma Bylines-Transcript Press, Norman, Oklahoma 1996 and republished 2000 by Inter-State Printing, Sedalia, Mo.  .

 
Defunct minor baseball leagues in the United States
Baseball leagues in Arkansas
Baseball leagues in Louisiana
Baseball leagues in Missouri
1934 establishments in Arkansas
1935 disestablishments in Arkansas
Sports leagues established in 1894
Sports leagues disestablished in 1935